LaBelle is a city in and the county seat of Hendry County, Florida, United States. The population was 4,640 at the 2010 census, up from 4,210 at the 2000 census. It was named for Laura June Hendry and Carrie Belle Hendry, daughters of pioneer cattleman Francis Asbury Hendry.

LaBelle hosts the annual Swamp Cabbage Festival, which is held in honor of the Florida state tree during the last full weekend of February.

Geography

LaBelle is located in northwestern Hendry County at  (26.760591, –81.439104), on the south side of the Caloosahatchee River.

Florida State Road 80 passes through the center of LaBelle, leading east  to Clewiston and west  to Fort Myers. Florida State Road 29 crosses SR 80 in the center of LaBelle and leads northeast  to Palmdale and south  to Immokalee.

Demographics

As of the census of 2000, there were 4,210 people, 1,440 households, and 995 families residing in the city. The racial makeup of the city was 73.28% White, 11.26% African American, 0.62% Native American, 0.33% Asian, 12.47% from other races, and 2.04% from two or more races. Hispanic or Latino of any race were 31.35% of the population.

There were 1,440 households, out of which 32.2% had children under the age of 18 living with them, 55.2% were married couples living together, 10.2% had a female householder with no husband present, and 30.9% were non-families. 25.9% of all households were made up of individuals, and 14.1% had someone living alone who was 65 years of age or older. The average household size was 2.71 and the average family size was 3.26.

In the city the population was spread out, with 26.8% under the age of 18, 8.5% from 18 to 24, 25.5% from 25 to 44, 18.3% from 45 to 64, and 20.9% who were 65 years of age or older. The median age was 36 years. For every 100 females, there were 102.7 males. For every 100 females age 18 and over, there were 99.8 males.

The median income for a household in the city was $31,642, and the median income for a family was $39,550. Males had a median income of $26,327 versus $21,979 for females. The per capita income for the city was $15,652. About 12.9% of families and 18.0% of the population were below the poverty line, including 21.1% of those under age 18 and 15.4% of those age 65 or over.

In 2010 LaBelle had a population of 4,640.  The racial and ethnic makeup of the population was 43.8% non-Hispanic white, 8.1% African American, 0.6% Asian, 0.1% Pacific Islander, 0.2% non-Hispanic from some other race, 1.6% from two or more races, and 47.0% Hispanic or Latino.

History

LaBelle began as a settlement on the Caloosahatchee River around the time of Hamilton Disston's efforts to drain the Everglades with the hope of promoting growth. The settlement, which lay on the western edge of Captain Francis A. Hendry's large Monroe County property, was initially populated with cattle drovers and trappers.

By 1891, LaBelle had constructed its first school on the ground of what would become the white-columned LaBelle School, built in 1915. By 1921, LaBelle school was one of 18 accredited schools in Florida. The campus is now Edward A. Upthegrove Elementary School, named after one of LaBelle's original two families.

In 1909, Captain Hendry subdivided his land from the Lee County courthouse to be sold. The majority landholding stake was bought by Edgar Everett (E. E.) Goodno, which increased LaBelle to almost twenty times its original size. In May 1924, Henry Ford acquired  in LaBelle from E. E. Goodno. Ford had made a loan of $166,986.46 to Goodno in 1922, securing the loan with Goodno's property. Two years later, Ford cancelled Goodno's debt and mortgage, gave him $63,000, and took the 7,000 acre deed from Goodno. Goodno stayed to manage the property, raising Poll Angus cattle, Brahman cattle, and Angora goats.<ref>Smoot, Tom. The Edisons of Fort Myers: Discoveries of the Heart, p. 169.</ref>

LaBelle's first church, a Methodist congregation, was established in 1891 and soon absorbed an older Methodist Church in nearby Fort Denaud. In 1912, LaBelle also had a Baptist church, among other denominations, with mass baptisms in the Caloosahatchee River.

LaBelle became the county seat of Hendry County in 1923. In 1925, the Florida Legislature chartered the City of LaBelle, which replaced the Town of LaBelle. D. A. Mitchell was named the first mayor.

In 1929 with part of LaBelle residing in Glades County and the majority in Hendry, the government of Glades County proposed resolving a bond dispute with the Hendry County government by surrendering all parts of LaBelle in Glades County. In an approved public referendum, the proposal was put forth and the portion of LaBelle in Glades was surrendered. Eight years later, the surrendered part of North LaBelle voted to annex itself back into Hendry County, as residents felt that the Glades County government in Moore Haven was ignoring them. The vote succeeded and what was previously North LaBelle was united back with the city of LaBelle.

Education

LaBelle's education system is made up of four elementary schools (LaBelle Elementary, Country Oaks Elementary, Edward A. Upthegrove Elementary, West Glades), one middle school (LaBelle Middle) and one high school (LaBelle High School). There also is a private school named International Christian Academy of Labelle.

Swamp Cabbage Festival

The city of LaBelle holds an annual festival celebrating the state tree, the cabbage palm. The festival includes activities throughout the town including a 5K walk/run, beauty pageant and rodeo among others, with the peak of celebration at LaBelle's Barron Park.

Notable people

 Bill Gramática, NFL place kicker
 Martín Gramática, NFL place kicker
 Mary Hayes Davis, publisher of The Hendry County News, Secretary of Chamber of Commerce, and owner of LaBelle Theatre during 1920s

 Fictional references 

 In Carl Hiaasen's novel Skinny Dip, agribusiness executive "Red" Hammernut has his offices in LaBelle, and owns significant areas of farmland in Hendry County.
 A scene from Just Cause'', a 1995 suspense crime thriller film directed by Arne Glimcher and starring Sean Connery and Laurence Fishburne, was filmed in Fort Denaud, Florida, just west of LaBelle.

Climate

The climate in this area is characterized by hot, humid summers and generally warm winters.  According to the Köppen Climate Classification system, LaBelle has a humid subtropical climate, bordering on a tropical savanna climate, abbreviated "Cfa"/“Aw” on climate maps.

References

External links

 City of LaBelle official website
 LaBelle history
 Swamp Cabbage Festival
 Caloosa Belle, newspaper that serves LaBelle, available archived in full-text with images in Florida Digital Newspaper Library

County seats in Florida
Cities in Hendry County, Florida
Cities in Florida